Walter Joseph Devoy (March 14, 1885 – December 17, 1953), was an American multi-sport athlete and executive.

In addition to his baseball career, Devoy played in the St. Louis Soccer League.  In 1923, he was an executive with the Ben Millers.

External links

References

1885 births
1953 deaths
American soccer players
Major League Baseball catchers
Baseball players from St. Louis
Soccer players from St. Louis
St. Louis Browns players
St. Louis Soccer League players
Danville Speakers players
Moline Plowboys players

Association footballers not categorized by position